HMS York was a 60-gun fourth rate ship of the line of the Royal Navy, built at Plymouth Dockyard and launched on 18 April 1706.

York was lengthened in 1738, and remained in service until 1750, when she was sunk to form part of a breakwater.

Notes

References

Lavery, Brian (2003) The Ship of the Line - Volume 1: The development of the battlefleet 1650-1850. Conway Maritime Press. .

Ships of the line of the Royal Navy
1700s ships
Ships sunk as breakwaters